Xiaoguwei Island, formerly known in English as , is an island in the Pearl River Delta in Guangdong Province, China. It is  administered as Xiaoguwei Subdistrict, a subdistrict in Panyu District, Guangzhou. The Guangzhou Higher Education Mega Center now occupies the entire island.

Geography

History
During the Canton trade, Xiaoguwei was used by French crews for repairs and burials. It lay on the southeastern side of the Huangpu or "Whampoa" anchorage. French access to Guangzhou was, however, frequently blocked by the British Navy amid its colonial, revolutionary, and Napoleonic Wars.

Transportation 
Xiaoguwei is connected with Luntou in Haizhu District by tunnel. Bridges on the Nansha Port Expressway, a toll road, links it to Henan Island (Haizhu District) in the west and the rest of Panyu District to the south. A third bridge connects it to Haizhu's Yingzhou Ecological Park and a fourth to Huangpu District's Changzhou Island in the northeast.

Dozens of bus routes cross the island and connect its universities with downtown Guangzhou, the most important of which is Bus 381, which connects every university to the two subway stations. There are regular buses and express commuter buses using the toll roads and having fewer stops. Many of the express buses connect different campuses of the island's universities. In addition to these routes, some universities offer their own shuttle services for their faculty and staff.

Metro stations
The Guangzhou Metro has two stations on the Xiaoguwei Island.

Higher Education Mega Center North station (Line 4)
Higher Education Mega Center South station (Line 4 & Line 7)

References

External links 
Guangzhou Government Website
Panyu District Government Website

Panyu District
Guangzhou Higher Education Mega Center
Islands of Guangzhou
River islands of China